Morgenrot can mean:

Morgenrot (film), a 1933 German submarine film set during World War I
:de:Morgenrot (Band), a 1970-80s German band